Darko Zdravkovski is a former Macedonian professional basketball Power forward.

References

External links
 Basketball.eurobasket.com

Macedonian men's basketball players
Living people
1970 births
Sportspeople from Skopje
KK Vardar players
KK Rabotnički players
KK MZT Skopje players
Power forwards (basketball)